Mandukara or Mandukra is a village located in Didwana tehsil in Nagaur of Rajasthan state, India.

 from Jodhpur, and
 from Mount Abu.

The village is administrated by a sarpanch (head of the village) who is elected every five years. In 2011 the population of the village was 2,793, with 519 households.

Mandukara village is the birthplace of Chetan Dudi who is an MLA from Deedwana Assembly constituency.

References 

Villages in Nagaur district